Lokapāla, Sanskrit and Pāli for "guardian of the world", has different uses depending on whether it is found in a Hindu or Buddhist context.

 In Hinduism, lokapāla refers to the Guardians of the Directions associated with the eight, nine and ten cardinal directions.
 In Buddhism, lokapāla refers to the Four Heavenly Kings, and to other protector spirits, whereas the  Guardians of the Directions are referred to as the 'dikpālas'

In Hinduism

In Hinduism, the guardians of the cardinal directions are called the Lokapalas (लोकपाल), or Dikpalaka. The four principal guardians are:

 Kubera (North)
 Yama (South)
 Indra (East)
  (West)

In Buddhism
In Buddhism, lokapāla are one of two broad categories of Dharmapāla (protectors of the Buddhist religion) -the other category being Wisdom Protectors. In China, "each is additionally associated with a specific direction and the Four Heraldic Animals of Chinese astronomy/astrology, as well as playing a more secular role in rural communities ensuring favorable weather for crops and peace throughout the land...Easily identified by their armor and boots, each has his own magic weapon and associations." Their names are (east) Dhrtarastra, (west) Virupaksa, (north) Vaishravana, and (south) Virudhaka.

In Tibetan Buddhism, many of these worldly protector deities are indigenous Tibetan deities, mountain gods, demons, spirits or ghosts that have been subjugated  by Padmasambhava or other great adepts and oath bound to  protect a monastery, geographic region, particular tradition or as guardians of Buddhism in general.

These worldly protectors are invoked and propitiated to aid the monastery or Buddhist practitioner materially and to remove obstacles to practice. However, since they are considered to be Samsaric beings, they are not worshiped or considered as objects of refuge.

According to Tripitaka Master Shramana Hsuan Hua of the City of Ten Thousand Buddhas, all of these beings are invoked (hooked and summoned) and exhorted to behave (subdued) and protect the Dharma and its practitioners in the Shurangama Mantra.

Classes of Worldly Protectors

Classes of Worldly Protector include:

 Lokapāla
 The Four Heavenly Kings - (Tib. Gyalpo)
 Oathbound spirits - (Tib. Damchen)

References

Sources

Kalsang, Ladrang (1996) The Guardian Deities of Tibet Delhi: Winsome Books. (Third Reprint 2003) 
 Linrothe, Rob (1999) Ruthless Compassion: Wrathful Deities in Early Indo-Tibetan Esoteric Buddhist Art  London: Serindia Publications. 
 De Nebesky-Wojkowitz, Rene. (1956) Oracles and Demons of Tibet. Oxford University Press. Reprint Delhi: Books Faith, 1996 - . Reprint Delhi: Paljor Publications, 2002- -

External links
 Buddhist Protectors - outline page at Himalayan Art Resources
 Buddhist Protectors: Worldly - images at Himalayan Art Resources
 Lokapalas and caturmaharajikas - Lokapalas and caturmaharajikas in rock carvings at Chilas and Thalpan on the Upper Indus (Pakistan)

 
Dharmapalas
Buddhist deities
Four Heavenly Kings
de:Lokapala